Galinsoor, also spelled Gelinsoor, is a town in Galmudug state of Somalia.

References
Galinsoor

Populated places in Mudug
Galmudug